Richard Lee Armstrong  (August 4, 1937 – August 9, 1991) was an American/Canadian scientist who was an expert in the fields of radiogenic isotope geochemistry and geochronology, geochemical evolution of the earth, geology of the American Cordillera, and large-magnitude crustal extension. He published over 170 scientific papers.

Armstrong was born in Seattle, Washington.

Education
In 1955, he moved to New Haven, Connecticut, to attend Yale University. He obtained his BSc in 1959 and a PhD in 1964. He stayed at Yale as assistant and associate professor in the geology department until 1973. While he was a Yale professor, he took two leaves, the first in 1963–1964 on a National Science Foundation Postdoctoral Fellowship at the University of Berne, and in 1968-1969 as a Morse and Guggenheim Fellow at the Australian National University and California Institute of Technology.

Career
In 1973, Armstrong moved to Vancouver, British Columbia, Canada to be an associate professor at the University of British Columbia. He was eventually made a full professor. In 1979, he became a Canadian citizen.

Armstrong studied the chronology of magmatism, metamorphism, and tectonics of western North America. He utilized several methodologies, including Potassium-Argon, Rubidium-Strontium, Uranium-Lead and Neodymium-Samarium to obtain isotopic data.

Armstrong's early theories guided research for a generation. His views were controversial and contested by many prominent isotope geochemists. It took decades for other scientists to accept his ideas. Before he died, Armstrong was vindicated through the recognition he received for his model of crustal recycling at the 1990 ICOG meeting in Canberra after presenting a paper on "The Persistent Myth of Crustal Growth".
 
Most of Armstrong's effort was spent systematically building an enormous database on the geochronology of the North American Cordillera. This database highlighted the magmatic evolution of the region and continues to provide a wealth of information to the scientific community.

Armstrong was an active member of the Geological Society of America and editorial boards for several journals. He participated in the peer review process of the National Science Foundation and Canada's Natural Sciences and Engineering Research Council. He also participated in Canada's Lithoprobe program a national geoscience research project and contributed to the development of the geological timescale, particularly the Triassic.

On August 9, 1991, Armstrong died of liver cancer, five days after his 54th birthday.

Accolades
1981, made a fellow of the Royal Society of Canada
1986, awarded a Killam Prize by the University of British Columbia
1990, awarded the Logan Medal by the Geological Association of Canada
The Richard Lee Armstrong Endowment Fund, an endowed scholarship, was established at the Department of Earth Sciences, University of British Columbia after his death
A new radiogenic isotope laboratory was dedicated to his memory by the University of British Columbia
 The asteroid 21362 Dickarmstrong

Often cited and recognized papers
Armstrong, R.L.. 1966. K-ar dating of plutonic and volcanic rocks in orogenic belts: Age determination by potassium argon: Heidelberg, Springer-Verlag, pp. 117–133.
Armstrong, R.L.. 1968. A model for Pb and Sr isotope evolution in a dynamic earth: Reviews of Geophysics, v. 6, pp. 175–199.
Armstrong, R.L.. 1972. Low-angle faults, hinterland of the Sevier orogenic belt, eastern Nevada and western Utah: Geological Society of America Bulletin, v. 83, pp. 1729–1754.
Armstrong, R.L.. 1981. Radiogenic isotopes; The case for crustal recycling on a near-steady-state no-continental-growth Earth: Royal Society of London Philosophical Transactions, v. 301, pp. 443–472.
Armstrong, R.L., 1988.  Mesozoic and Early Cenozoic Magmatism of the Canadian Cordillera.  doi: 10.1130/SPE218-p55 GSA Special Papers 1988, v. 218, pp. 55–92 
Armstrong, R.L, Parrish, R.. 1990. A geologic excursion across the Canadian Cordillera near 49°N (Highways 1 and 3 from Vancouver to southwestern Alberta and on to Calgary, Alberta): Geological Association of Canada Meeting, Vancouver, May, Field Trip Guidebook, 71 p.
Harland, W.B.; Armstrong, R.L.; Cox, A.V.; Craig, L.E.; Smith, A.G.; Smith, D.G., 1990. A Geologic Time Scale, 1989 edition. Cambridge University Press: Cambridge, pp. 1–263. 
Armstrong, R.L., 1991.  The Persistent Myth of Crustal Growth.  Austral. J. Earth Sci., Vol: 38:613–63

See also
Age of the Earth

References
Geosociety Newsletter- March 1993
Geolog- Spring 2003
Mineralogical Association of Canada- Dr Edward Dale Ghent

External links
History of the Canadian Cordillera
UBS Earth and Ocean Sciences Donations
Isotope Geochemistry

1937 births
1991 deaths
20th-century Canadian geologists
Fellows of the Royal Society of Canada
Yale University alumni
Deaths from cancer in British Columbia
California Institute of Technology faculty
Academic staff of the University of British Columbia Faculty of Science
Scientists from Seattle
Scientists from Vancouver
American emigrants to Canada
Yale University faculty
Logan Medal recipients
Deaths from liver cancer
Presidents of the Canadian Association of Physicists